The 2019–20 Copa del Rey was the 118th staging of the Copa del Rey (including two seasons where two rival editions were played). In its original format, the winners were assured a place in the 2020–21 UEFA Europa League group stage, however this place was forfeited under the extraordinary circumstances of the COVID-19 pandemic in Spain, with the two finalists (Athletic Bilbao and Real Sociedad) opting instead to delay the date of the postponed match. Both finalists qualified for the four-team 2020–21 Supercopa de España.

The defending champions Valencia were eliminated by Granada in the quarter-finals. Real Sociedad won the final 1–0 against Basque rivals Athletic Bilbao, achieving their third overall Copa del Rey title and first since 1987, ending a 34-year trophy drought.

As across Spain, match times up to 26 October 2019 and from 29 March 2020 were CEST (UTC+2). Times on interim ("winter") days were CET (UTC+1).

Schedule and format
On 29 April 2019, the assembly of the Royal Spanish Football Federation approved the new competition format, expanding the competition to 125 teams and changing all rounds to a single-match format until the semi-finals.

Video assistant referee was used from the round of 16.

The RFEF confirmed the dates on 31 July 2019.

Notes
Double-match rounds enforced away goals rule.
Games ending in a tie were decided in extra time, and if still level, by a penalty shoot-out.
Due to the COVID-19 pandemic in Spain, the final was postponed; the participants (Athletic Bilbao and Real Sociedad) agreed to delay the event until such a time as supporters were permitted to be present, but this meant the deadline for UEFA registration would be missed; therefore the UEFA Europa League place normally on offer passed over to La Liga.

Qualified teams
The following teams qualified for the competition. Reserve teams were excluded.

Preliminary round

Draw
Teams were divided into four groups according to geographical criteria.

Matches

First round
The first round was played by all the qualified teams except the four participants in the Supercopa de España paired by a draw where the ten winners from the previous preliminary round were paired with ten teams from the La Liga. The remaining six teams and the 22 teams of Segunda were paired with the four Copa Federación semifinalists, the 21 that compete in Tercera and three from Segunda B. Finally, the remaining 35 teams from Segunda B were paired between them, one team received a bye in this round. In the case of rivals of the same category, the home advantage was decided by the order of extraction of the balls and otherwise, it was in the stadium of the lower category team. A total of 55 games were played, with 111 participating teams, from December 17 to 19, 2019.

Draw
Teams were divided into five pots according to their division in the 2019–20 season, except Andorra, included in the pot 1 as participant of the preliminary round.

Matches
Yeclano received a bye in this round.

Notes

Second round

Draw
Teams were divided into four pots according to their division in the 2019–20 season. Tercera División teams were drawn with others from La Liga, while the rest of Segunda B and Tercera teams were drawn with teams from La Liga and Segunda División.

Matches

Final phase

Bracket

Round of 32

Draw
The four participant teams of the 2019–20 Supercopa de España were firstly drawn with the teams from the lowest category. After them, all the remaining teams from the lowest categories faced the rest of La Liga teams. The draw was held on 14 January 2020.

Matches

Round of 16

Draw
Six teams of La Liga were firstly drawn with the teams from the lower categories. After them, all the remaining teams from La Liga teams faced one another. The draw was held on 24 January 2020.

Matches

Quarter-finals

Draw
All 8 teams were in one pot, and the home team was decided by the luck of the draw. As the only remaining Segunda División side, Mirandés hosted its opponent regardless, as per the rules. The draw took place on 31 January 2020.

Matches

Semi-finals
The draw for the semi-finals took place on 7 February 2020.

Summary

|}

Matches

Real Sociedad won 3–1 on aggregate.

2–2 on aggregate. Athletic Bilbao won on away goals.

Final

The final was originally scheduled for 18 April 2020, but was postponed to 3 April 2021 due to the COVID-19 pandemic.

Top scorers

Notes

References

External links
Regulations and participants
Royal Spanish Football Federation official website
Copa del Rey at LFP website

2019-20
1
Association football events postponed due to the COVID-19 pandemic